The 2009–10 Ukrainian Cup was the 19th annual season of Ukraine's football knockout competition, currently known as DATAGROUP – Football Ukraine Cup or Kubok of Ukraine.

The Cup began with the preliminary round where teams from Druha Liha and Amateur Cup champions participate. In the Second Preliminary Round teams from Persha Liha are drawn into the competition and then in the Round of 32 teams from the Premier League enter the competition.

Tavriya Simferopol defeated Metalurh Donetsk 3–2 in the Cup Final and are Ukraine's Cup Winner representative in the play-off round of the UEFA Europa League 2010–11.

Team allocation 
Fifty two teams entered the competition

Distribution

Round and draw dates 
All draws held at FFU headquarters (Building of Football) in Kyiv unless stated otherwise.

Bye berth 

The bye berth appeared because of a small technicality in the pre-season berth allocation. Originally FC Ihroservice Simferopol to the last moment was considered as a member of the 2009–10 First League, yet it was given a condition to provide financial guarantees with the suspense time on July 8, 2009 (2pm LST). With the already ongoing Ukrainian Cup competition that was drawn on July 7, 2009 (just a day ahead), the Crimean club failed to satisfy that condition. The Professional Football League of Ukraine withdrew the club from all its competitions and arranged additional play-off between the second placed teams of the 2008-09 Ukrainian Second League (Arsenal – Poltava). After winning the play-off on July 12, 2009, FC Arsenal Bila Tserkva became a member of the 2009-10 Ukrainian First League, yet the berth assigned to Ihroservice was preserved as bye which was given to FC Kharkiv during the draw on July 22, 2009.

Competition schedule

First Preliminary Round (1/64) 
In this round entered 17 teams from Druha Liha and winners of the Ukrainian Amateur Cup. The draw for the First Preliminary Round was held on July 7, 2009. The matches were played July 18, 2009.

Notes:

 Qualify as Amateur Cup Champions of Ukraine 2008 
 Match not played due to bus accident involving Dynamo Khmelnytsky with several key players receiving serious injuries. PFL withdraws Dynamo from the Cup competition. 
 Originally drawn in this round, Yednist Plysky advanced into the next round due to FC Titan Donetsk withdrawal from the Professional ranks.
 Technical 3–0 victory awarded to FC Morshyn. Olimpik Donetsk refused to travel, explaining that its staff had to arrange Euro U-19 2009. The PFL fined Olimpik Donetsk 15,000 hryvni for not arriving for the scheduled match.

Second Preliminary Round (1/32) 
In this round entered all 18 teams from Persha Liha. They were drawn against the 9 winners of the First Preliminary Round. The draw for the Second Preliminary Round took place July 22, 2009.
The matches were played August 5, 2009, unless otherwise noted.

Notes:

 FC Kharkiv advances into the next round due to Ihroservice Simferopol withdrawal from the professional ranks.

 The match was played on August 4, 2009

 The match was played in Bucha, Kyiv Oblast

Bracket

Round of 32 
In this round entered all 16 teams from the Premier League. They were drawn against the 16 winners from the previous round. The draw was random and held on August 6, 2009.

Notes:

 The match played at Spartak Stadium (Odessa), Odessa to accommodate a larger crowd .

 The match played at Dynamo Club Stadium, Chapayevka (Konche-Zaspa), Kyiv after CSCA Kyiv's home ground was found unsafe.

 Goals for Naftovyk not scored – Andriy Kikot and Oleksandr Aharin, for Metalurh (D) – Fabihno.

 Goals for CSCA not scored – Oleksandr Polishchuk and Oleksandr Kurylko, for Obolon – Mykola Moroziuk.

 Volodymyr Bohdanov scored on the second attempt after his penalty shot was saved by Mykola Virkovsky.

Round of 16 

In this round entered winners from the previous round (11 Premier League, 4 Persha Liha and 1 Druha Liha teams). The draw is random and was held on August 19, 2009.

Quarterfinals 

In this round entered winners from the previous round (7 Premier League and 1 Persha Liha teams). The draw was random and was held on September 23, 2009.

Semifinals 

In this round entered winners from the previous round (3 Premier League and 1 Persha Liha teams). The draw is random and was held on November 11, 2009.

Final 

The Cup final was played on May 16, 2010.

Top goalscorers 

As of May 16, 2010

See also 
 Ukrainian Second League 2009–10
 Ukrainian Premier League Reserves 2009-10
 Ukrainian First League 2009–10
 UEFA Europa League 2009–10

External links 
 PFL official website 
 UPL official website

References 

Ukrainian Cup seasons
Cup
Ukrainian Cup